Marko Bojić (born ) is a Montenegrin volleyball player. He is part of the Montenegro men's national volleyball team. On club level he plays for Yeni Kızıltepe Spor Kulubü.

References

External links
 profile at FIVB.org
  at sporting.pt

1988 births
Living people
Montenegrin men's volleyball players
Place of birth missing (living people)
 PAOK V.C. players
Resovia (volleyball) players